Cibotium regale, common name royal cibotium or royal Mexican tree fern, is a species of tropical tree fern belonging to the family Cibotiaceae.

Description
Leaves are bipinnate, lanceolate, and arranged opposite one another. The beautiful fronds  are deep-bluish green and almost angular. Frond bases are covered with hairs. This plant prefers medium shade, moisture, and organic soils.

Distribution
This species occurs in Guatemala, Mexico, Honduras and El Salvador.

References

External links

 Tropicos
 The Plant List
 Plant Name Index
 Forest Ferns

regale
Ferns of Mexico
Ferns of the Americas
Flora of Guatemala
Flora of Honduras
Flora of El Salvador
Flora of the Yucatán Peninsula